Frognot is an unincorporated community east of Blue Ridge on FM 981 in Collin County, located in the U.S. state of Texas.

History 
The Frognot community was located east of Blue Ridge. It had a store and a school. The Frognot water district still survives. The name is also spelled Frog Not.

There are several theories as to where the name came from. One is that the area had an abundance of frogs. They killed the frogs and became known as Frognot. Another theory is that the boys brought frogs to school. The school adopted a no frog policy. Some people say the name is actually Frog Nod because the frogs are singing when they nod off to sleep.

Frognot Community Historical Marker 
The Frognot Community historical marker is located on the north side FM 981 east of Collin County road 628.  The text on the historical marker reads:

"Situated near creeks and branches in a valley east of Blue Ridge, the Frognot community (also known as Frog Not, Frog Nod, Frogknot) has a number of theories as to the origins of its name. Most of these theories involve frogs that appear in the nearby Indian Creek following a rain. Several theories are associated with the nearby Dixon Consolidated School, which served as the foundation for the establishment of the community in the early 1900s. The school was founded in 1913 on land from Stephen Arnold Douglas Box. The school had a strict schoolmaster, Mr. Homer Parkins, who would not allow kids to bring frogs they captured in the creek to school. This policy evolved into several stories as to the origin of the community name. Another theory is that soon after the community was founded, the people attempted to eradicate the overabundant frog population. Within a short time, they virtually wiped out the frog populace, giving the community the name Frognot. Some believe that the community began as Frog Nod because the frogs were extremely loud while nodding off to sleep, and eventually became Frognot. Another theory is that the residents did not want a noisy railroad switch, which is also known as a railroad frog, and thus the community was named Frog Not. In the late 1930s, John and Ollie McGuffey opened the first general store. A second store was opened in the 1950s by Otis and Hazel Dixon. The Dixon Store served as the social center of the community and was the location of the foundation of the Frognot Water Supply Corporation. The concrete storm cellar from the Dixon School is all that remains of this rural community."

(2013) Marker is Property of the State of Texas

Frognot Store 
In 1926, Otis and Hazel Dixon opened Frognot General Store, where they sold Sinclair gasoline for 10 cents a gallon, as well as salt, bread, milk, and sometimes vegetables from their own garden.  They also sold Black Angus beef from the livestock raised by Otis, long before Black Angus was known as a premium product.  The store was a gathering place for local folk, and where the idea of starting Frognot Water Supply Corporation was born.  The store has been closed since the late 1980s.

Frognot Water Supply 

Frognot WSC was incorporated on December 22, 1965 for the sole purpose of providing water to the rural area of Blue Ridge, Texas from the Woodbine Aquifer. The system consists of three wells and over 68 miles of water line and includes 147 square miles of service area in the Blackland Prairie.

AND THE STORY GOES...

The Frognot Water Supply Corporation was created when the local farmers and ranchers met in the Dixon General Store in the Frognot Community October 1965.  Prior to this time, the Frognotters collected water from cisterns and wells.  On December 22, 1965, the Frognot Water Supply Corporation was incorporated to provide safe, potable water to members who reside in the rural, unincorporated area near Blue Ridge, Texas.  One hundred and four meters were needed for the water system.  A total of 107 were purchased including 38 meters which were purchased by 17 people to insure the creation of the Frognot Water Supply Corporation.  Truman Webb was the first General Manager (1965-July 1987).  Robert Todd became the second General Manager in August 1987 and continues to serve.

When the system was first installed, Mary Hall of Garland, Texas painted the first frog on the big tank for the Frognot Water Supply corporation as a public service.  Mrs. Hall, who was very brave, got on a scaffold and painted a bright green man-size portrait of a frog sitting on a toadstool or a mushroom. The frog on the tank looked like a cross between a tree frog, a leopard frog and a lizard which was a frog of rather unconventional appearance.  It appeared that Mrs. Hall wanted the frog to have as much life as the community.  Her painting stayed on the tank until it rusted and was repainted in 1974.  In 2000, Matt Alderson, who was fourteen at the time, sketched a frog which was selected by the board to serve as the FWSC logo; he too got on a scaffold and painted the frog on the water tanks.  His sketching of the frog has become a symbol for Frognot and adorns each of the three tanks that pump water from the Woodbine Aquifer.

The water from the Woodbine Aquifer provides water for the rural area of Blue Ridge, Texas.  The system consists of three wells and over 70 miles of water line and includes 147 square miles of service to 583 customers in the small communities of Frognot, Arnold, Bethlehem, Fayburg, Jamestown, Moreland and Pike.

References

Unincorporated communities in Collin County, Texas
Unincorporated communities in Texas